Ludmer is a historical and mountainous region around Bratunac, in eastern Bosnia and Herzegovina, part of the wider Birač and Podrinje regions. It borders the Osat region. The region is inhabited by ethnic Serbs and Bosniaks.

It was a nahiya during the Ottoman period.

References

Sources

Historical regions of Bosnia and Herzegovina
Župas of the medieval Bosnian state
Former subdivisions of Bosnia and Herzegovina during Ottoman period